Island Bay was a former New Zealand electorate, centred on Island Bay in the southern suburbs of Wellington. The electorate was formed in 1946 and dissolved in 1996.

Population centres
The 1941 New Zealand census had been postponed due to World War II, so the 1946 electoral redistribution had to take ten years of population growth and movements into account. The North Island gained a further two electorates from the South Island due to faster population growth. The abolition of the country quota through the Electoral Amendment Act, 1945 reduced the number and increased the size of rural electorates. None of the existing electorates remained unchanged, 27 electorates were abolished, eight former electorates were re-established, and 19 electorates were created for the first time, including Island Bay.

History
The electorate was held by five MPs from the Labour Party for the whole of its existence from 1946 to 1996. Robert McKeen was the first representative; he had since the  represented the
 electorate. McKeen was the Speaker of the House of Representatives from 1947 to 1950. He retired from Parliament in 1954.

Nordmeyer was Minister of Finance in the Second Labour Government from 1957 to 1960, and is remembered for the black budget which contributed to Labour's defeat in 1960. Nordmeyer had moved to the Island Bay electorate when the Brooklyn electorate was abolished.

Gerald O'Brien was deselected by Labour for the electorate in 1978, and ran against the new Labour candidate Frank O'Flynn. O'Flynn was Minister of Defence in the Fourth Labour Government from 1984 to 1987.

Members of Parliament
Key

Election results

1993 election

1990 election

1987 election

1984 election

1981 election

1978 election

1975 election

1972 election

1969 election

1966 election

1963 election

1960 election

1957 election

1954 election

1951 election

1949 election

1946 election

Notes

References

External links
1975, Mr Nathan the National candidate below a defaced poster (photo)

Historical electorates of New Zealand
Politics of the Wellington Region
1946 establishments in New Zealand
1996 disestablishments in New Zealand